John J. Strauss is an American producer and writer of film and television.

He has written and produced for the television series Boy Meets World (and known as the writer who came up with the character name for Topanga Lawrence, naming her after Topanga Canyon), Me and the Boys and Odd Man Out. He has also written several episodes of the Amazon series Mozart in the Jungle, which received a Golden Globe Award nomination for "Best TV Series Comedy" in 2015. He is an executive producer for The Breaks.

Since 1998, Strauss has mainly focused on films, co-writing the screenplays for There's Something About Mary (1998), Head Over Heels (2001), The Santa Clause 2, The Lizzie McGuire Movie (2003), Rebound (2005), The Wild (2006), The Santa Clause 3: The Escape Clause (2006), You Again (2010). and Free Birds (2013).

He famously cast Eric the Actor in an episode of the TV show “In Plain Sight”, with Eric playing a disgruntled midget landlord during a story involving the FBI investigating a hoarder. Eric ad-libbed the line “Keys, woman” when the script called for him to hold the keys himself - something his disability made difficult due to his deformed hands.

He frequently collaborates with fellow producer and writer Ed Decter. He, along with Decter replaced Barry Kemp as showrunner of the CBS Tom Selleck comedy The Closer, which eventually came out in 1998.

Strauss is also a graduate of the University of California, Berkeley and UCLA, where he received a BFA degree in Motion Picture (Film) and TV.

References

External links

American film producers
American male screenwriters
American television writers
American television producers
Living people
Place of birth missing (living people)
American male television writers
Year of birth missing (living people)